Leighanne Robe (born 26 December 1993) is an English professional football defender who plays for Liverpool.

Club career

Robe joined a boys' football team as a seven-year-old, represented Cambridge City girls, and progressed to playing for Arsenal's youth system. A versatile defender, she joined Watford of FA WSL 2 in August 2014.

Millwall Lionesses signed Robe for the 2016 FA WSL 2 season. She played in every match and was given a contract extension for the FA WSL Spring Series. She made 42 league appearances, scoring twice For the Lionesses. In June 2018 Robe transferred to Liverpool, whose manager Neil Redfearn said: "Leighanne is a quality, tough-tackling defender who is also a real leader." On the 30th of January 2022, Robe scored her first goals for Liverpool on her 81st appearance by scoring a hat-trick in a FA Cup tie against Lincoln City FC.

Career statistics

Club

Honours
Liverpool F.C. Women
 
FA Women's Championship: 2021–2022:

References

External links

1993 births
Women's association football defenders
Women's Super League players
English women's footballers
Millwall Lionesses L.F.C. players
Arsenal W.F.C. players
Liverpool F.C. Women players
Watford F.C. Women players
Living people
Sportspeople from Cambridge